Monapia is a genus of South American anyphaenid sac spiders first described by Eugène Simon in 1897.

Species
 it contains thirteen species:
Monapia alupuran Ramírez, 1995 — Chile
Monapia angusta (Mello-Leitão, 1944) — Uruguay, Argentina
Monapia carolina Ramírez, 1999 — Argentina
Monapia charrua Ramírez, 1999 — Uruguay, Argentina
Monapia dilaticollis (Nicolet, 1849) — Chile, Argentina, Juan Fernandez Is.
Monapia fierro Ramírez, 1999 — Argentina
Monapia guenoana Ramírez, 1999 — Uruguay, Argentina
Monapia huaria Ramírez, 1995 — Chile
Monapia lutea (Nicolet, 1849) — Chile, Argentina
Monapia pichinahuel Ramírez, 1995 — Chile, Argentina
Monapia silvatica Ramírez, 1995 — Chile, Argentina
Monapia tandil Ramírez, 1999 — Argentina
Monapia vittata (Simon, 1884) — Chile, Argentina

References

External links

Anyphaenidae
Araneomorphae genera